San Giuliano Milanese railway station is a railway station in Italy. Located on the Milan–Bologna railway, it serves the town of San Giuliano Milanese and is located in Via Roma.

Services
San Giuliano Milanese is served by lines S1 and S12 of the Milan suburban railway service, operated by the Lombard railway company Trenord.

See also
 Milan suburban railway service

References

External links

Railway stations in Lombardy
Milan S Lines stations
Railway stations opened in 1931